Vice-Admiral S. Tauqir H. Naqvi (is a retired three-star rank admiral in the Pakistan Navy, politician, and a diplomat who served as the Chairman of the Pakistan National Shipping Corporation (PNSC) from 2000 until 2007, the longest serving chairman in the national flag carrier's history.

Biography

Naqvi joined the Pakistan Navy in 1960 whose career mostly spent in the Navy SEALs Teams of the Special Service Group of the Pakistan Navy, having helped in preparing a documentary on SEALs. His military training as a military diver comes from the United States Navy SEALs after 1965.

He served in the second war in 1965 and Western front of third war with India in 1971, having commanding the SX-404-class submarine as a Lieutenant-Commander. In 1971, Lt-Cdr.

An order of firing off the torpedo was issued but the SX-404-class failed to struck the Indian Navy's Petya-class frigates; the Indian Navy's flotilla, unaware of being spied and watched on, passed through safely, which he called the captains of the Petya-class as the "lucky ones." After the war, Commander Naqvi served as a Navy SEAL instructor at the Naval Base Iqbal in the Karachi coast, eventually serving as commanding officer of the SX-404-class and overseeing its phasing out from the Navy in the 1990s. In 1991–93, he was appointed as military attaché at the Pakistan Embassy in Tokyo, Japan.

In 1993–94, Rear-Admiral Naqvi was assigned to join the Prime Minister Benazir Bhutto's administration, eventually taking an assignment as Additional Secretary at the Defense Division of the Ministry of Defense. In 1994–96, R-Adm. Naqvi later went to serve as the DG Joint Warfare (DG TJ) and DG Training (DG Trig) at the Joint Staff Headquarters.

In 2000, Vice-Admiral Naqvi was eventually taken as an secondment in the Musharraf administration when he was appointed Chairman of the National Shipping Corporation, which he served till 2007. His tenureship was credited for overseeing the fleet expansion of the National Shipping Corporation. On 21 August 2002, Adm. Naqvi's name was shortlisted and was considered in a race of joining the Aziz administration as an Interior Minister, eventually Faisal Hayat was later confirmed.

After his retirement, he remained associate with the tradition of Navy SEALs, having helped in preparing a documentary on SEALs.

See also
Pakistan Navy

References

Living people
Muhajir people
People from Karachi
Pakistan Military Academy alumni
Pakistani expatriates in the United States
N
Pakistani spies
N
National Defence University, Pakistan alumni
Naval War College alumni
Academic staff of Pakistan Naval War College
Pakistani expatriates in Japan
Pakistan Navy admirals
Government of Benazir Bhutto staffers and personnel
Pakistani diplomats
Year of birth missing (living people)